is the fifteenth studio album by Japanese heavy metal band Loudness. It was released in 2001 only in Japan. It also marked the first time since 1988's Jealousy that the original and classic line-up recorded together.

Track listing
All music by Akira Takasaki, Minoru Niihara, Munetaka Higuchi and Masayoshi Yamashita, except for "Spiritual Canoe" by Takasaki. Lyrics by Niihara, except on tracks 3, 4, 7, 11 by Takasaki

"The Winds of Victory" - 4:41
"The Hate That Fills My Lonely Cells" - 6:00
"The End of Earth" - 4:29
"Stay Wild" - 5:48
"The Seven Deadly Sins" - 5:31
"Picture Your Life" - 3:20
"How Many More Times" - 5:40
"Touch My Heart" - 5:10
"Climaxxx" - 4:05
"A Stroke of Lightning" - 5:13
"Never Forget You" - 5:00
"Spiritual Canoe" (instrumental) - 1:32
"The Power of Love" - 7:06

Personnel
Loudness
Minoru Niihara - vocals
Akira Takasaki - guitars
Masayoshi Yamashita - bass 
Munetaka Higuchi - drums

Production
Masatoshi Sakimoto - engineer, mixing
Tatsuhiko Kaneko - assistant engineer
Hiroyuki Hosaka - mastering
Toshi Nakashita, Eiichi Yamakawa - executive producers

References

2001 albums
Loudness (band) albums
Nippon Columbia albums
Japanese-language albums